Vilapata (possibly from Aymara wila blood, blood-red, pata step, stone bench, "red step") is a mountain in the Vilcanota mountain range in the Andes of Peru, about  high. It lies in the Puno Region, Melgar Province, Nuñoa District. It is situated at the Quenamari valley, northeast of Chiaracce.

References

Mountains of Peru
Mountains of Puno Region